Russula grata is a species of fungus belonging to the family Russulaceae.

It has a cosmopolitan distribution.

References

grata
Taxa named by Max Britzelmayr